Cosmopterix chalupae is a moth of the Cosmopterigidae family. The species was first described in 1995 in the Salta Province of Argentina, and was classified as a distinct species in 2010.

Physically, C. chalupae resembles Cosmopterix trifasciella, but differ in the coloration of the antennae. Additionally, C. chalupae possesses a collection of pale yellow spots on the abdomen, further distinguishing it from other species in the genus.

References

chalupae